Sir Charles Le Grosse (1596 – 1650) of Crostwight Hall near North Walsham in Norfolk, England, was a politician who sat in the House of Commons at various times between 1628 and 1653.

Origins
Le Grosse was the son of Sir Thomas Le Grosse / Le Gros (died 1613) of Crostwight and of Sloley, both in Norfolk, by his wife Elizabeth Cornwallis, a daughter of Sir Charles Cornwallis, of Brome, Suffolk, MP. The Le Grosse family probably descended from William Gross of Norfolk, a land-holder mentioned in the Domesday Book of 1086. The chest tomb of Oliver le Gros (died 1435) survives in St Bartholomew's Church, Sloley, displaying the arms of Le Gross: Quarterly argent and azure, on a bend sable three martlets or, which also survive on the "Crostwight Flagon", a silver wine flagon made in 1585 by Peterson of Norwich, presented to Crostwight Church probably by Thomas Le Gross, now in Norwich Castle Museum.

Career
He was knighted on 6 December 1616 and served as Sheriff of Norfolk for 1626–27. In 1628 he was elected as a Member of Parliament for Orford in Suffolk, and sat until 1629 when King Charles I decided to rule without parliament for eleven years. In April 1640, Le Grosse was re-elected MP for Orford in the Short Parliament and was re-elected MP for Orford for the Long Parliament in November 1640, retaining his seat until 1653. In 1637, together with Dr. Thomas Lushington, he was instrumental in persuading the physician and philosopher Thomas Browne, to re-locate to Norwich. In 1658 Browne dedicated his Hydriotaphia, Urn Burial to Thomas Le Grosse, his eldest son. Le Grosse died before 31 May 1660.

Marriage and issue
He married Muriel Knyvet, a daughter of Sir Thomas Knyvet (died 1605) by his wife Elizabeth, and by the marriage settlement he acquired a moiety of the manor of Eccles, which allowed him to hold courts there. By his wife he had two sons and six daughters, including:
Thomas Le Grosse, eldest son and heir.

Poem by Ralph Knevet
The poet Ralph Knevet dedicated the following poem to him:

References

 

1650 deaths
High Sheriffs of Norfolk
English MPs 1628–1629
English MPs 1640 (April)
English MPs 1640–1648
English MPs 1648–1653
People from North Norfolk (district)
Year of birth uncertain